Mentzer is a surname. Notable people with the surname include:

Ethan Mentzer, member of The Click Five
Frank Mentzer, American fantasy author
John Thomas Mentzer, American marketing professor
Mike Mentzer, American bodybuilder
Ray Mentzer, American bodybuilder, brother of Mike
Steven Mentzer, American politician in Pennsylvania
Susanne Mentzer, operatic mezzo-soprano
William C. Mentzer, aeronautical engineer

See also
 
Mentzer Building
Mentzer index
Mentzen